Autoroute 10 may refer to:
 A10 autoroute (France)
 Quebec Autoroute 10, in Quebec, Canada

See also 
 list of A10 roads
 List of highways numbered 10